Each "article" in this category is a collection of entries about several stamp issuers, presented in alphabetical order. The entries are formulated on the micro model and so provide summary information about all known issuers. 

See the :Category:Compendium of postage stamp issuers page for details of the project.

Cabinda 

Formerly Portuguese Congo, this territory had protectorate status since 1883 and was separate from Portuguese West Africa. As part of various independence movements in the 1960s a group called Front for the Liberation of the Enclave of Cabinda (FLEC) established a government-in-exile in Kinshasa. FLEC made a unilateral declaration of independence on 1 August 1975 but it was not recognised by Portugal or internationally.

In November 1975, Angolan troops of the MPLA occupied Cabinda which was annexed into the newly independent Angolan state. Angola calls the territory Cabinda Province. Since then, FLEC and other factions within Cabinda have struggled for full independence and seek to form the Republic of Cabinda.

Various organizations have issued stamps for Cabinda (widely regarded as cinderellas). These include:
The Cabinda National Philatelic Bureau, which issued a set of eleven overprints on Angolan stamps, all with a denomination of 500 Central African francs, with designs showing fauna and mushrooms on 27 October 2006. These stamps have seen some use as paquebot mail in Barbados.
The Federation of Free States of Africa, which issued thirty one designs showing the coat of arms and flag as well as ships, fauna, planes, natives and a map of Africa from 2010 to 2012.
Other stamps and miniature sheets for thematic collectors appeared on eBay, Delcampe and other websites from sellers in Belarus, France, Israel and the United States.

Refer 	Angola;
		Portuguese Congo

Caicos Islands 

Separate issues by the Caicos part of the Turks & Caicos Islands, which are in the Caribbean
north of Hispaniola. The Caicos are not politically independent of the Turks and there remains
some controversy about the validity of the stamps, although they have been accepted for postal
use.

Dates 	1981 – 1985
Currency 	100 cents = 1 dollar

Refer 	Turks & Caicos Islands

Calchi 

Refer 	Khalki

Calimno 

Refer 	Kalimnos

Calino 

Refer 	Kalimnos

Calymnos 

Refer 	Kalimnos

Cambodge 

Refer 	Cambodia

Cambodia 

Dates 	1951–1975; 1980 –
Capital 	Phnom Penh
Currency 	(1951) 100 cents = 1 piastre
		(1955) 100 cents = 1 riel

Main Article
Postage stamps and postal history of Cambodia

Includes 	Kampuchea;
		Khmer Republic

See also 	Indochina

Cambodia (Indochina) 

One issue in 1936 when part of French Indochina.

Dates 	1936
Currency 	100 cents = 1 piastre

Refer 	Indochina Territories

See also 	Annam (Indochina)

Cameroons (British Occupation) 

British and French forces occupied the country during World War I and issue German Kamerun Yacht types with overprint of CEF and British currency value. The British section became Southern Cameroons and was administered as part of Nigeria until 1960 when it rejoined Cameroun (the former French section) after a plebiscite.

Dates 	1915 only
Currency 	12 pence = 1 shilling; 20 shillings = 1 pound

Refer 	British Occupation Issues

See also 	Southern Cameroons

Cameroun 

The German colony of Kamerun was occupied by French and British forces during World War I. Southern Cameroons became part of Nigeria but the remainder was administered by France until 1960 as Cameroun.

During the World War I occupation period, the French issued stamps of Gabon overprinted Corps Expeditionnaire Franco–Anglais CAMEROUN; and stamps of Middle Congo overprinted CAMEROUN Occupation Française. After the war, the Middle Congo stamps were simply overprinted CAMEROUN. The first issues specifically for Cameroun were produced in 1925.
Cameroun became an independent republic in 1960 and, following a plebiscite, Southern Cameroons was reunited with it.

Dates 	1915 –
Capital 	Yaoundé
Currency 	100 centimes = 1 franc

Main Articles
Postage stamps and postal history of Cameroon
Postage stamps and postal history of British Cameroons

See also 	Kamerun

Canada 

Dates 	1851 –
Capital 	Ottawa
Currency 	(1851) 12 pence = 1 shilling; 20 shillings = 1 pound
		(1859) 100 cents = 1 dollar

See also 	Canadian Provinces

Canadian Provinces 

Main article 

Includes 	British Columbia;
		British Columbia & Vancouver Island;
		New Brunswick;
		New Carlisle (Gaspé);
		Newfoundland;
		Nova Scotia;
		Prince Edward Island;
		Vancouver Island

See also 	Canada

Canal Zone 

Now uses stamps of Panama.

Dates 	1904–1979
Capital 	Balboa
Currency 	100 cents = 1 balboa

Main article
Postage stamps and postal history of the Canal Zone

Canary Islands 

Overprinted airmail stamps were used during the Spanish Civil War.

Dates 	1936–1938
Capital 	Las Palmas
Currency 	100 centimos = 1 peseta

Main article 

See also 	Spain

Candia 

Refer 	Kandia

Canea 

Refer 	Khania (Italian Post Office)

Canouan 

Unauthorised issues only. Canouan is one of the islands of the Grenadines of St Vincent.

Refer 	Grenadines of St Vincent

Canton (Indochinese Post Office) 

Indochinese PO in China.

Dates 	1901–1922
Currency 	(1901) 100 centimes = 1 franc
		(1919) 100 cents = 1 piastre

Refer 	China (Indochinese Post Offices)

Cape Colony 

Refer 	Cape of Good Hope

Cape Juby 

Cape Juby became part of Spanish Sahara in 1950 and is now in Morocco.

Dates 	1916–1950
Currency 	100 centimos = 1 peseta

Refer 	Spanish West Africa

Cape of Good Hope 

Dates 	1853–1910
Capital 	Cape Town
Currency 	12 pence = 1 shilling; 20 shillings = 1 pound

Main article 

Includes 	British Bechuanaland;
		Griqualand West;
		Mafeking;
		Stellaland Republic;
		Vryburg

Cape Province 

Refer 	Cape of Good Hope

Cape Verde Islands 

Dates 	1877 –
Capital 	Praia
Currency 	100 centavos = 1 escudo

Main article needed  Postage stamps and postal history of Cape Verde

See also 	Africa (Portuguese Colonies)

Carchi 

Refer 	Khalki

Caribbean Netherlands 

Dates 	2010-
Currency 	100 cents = 1 gulden (florin) (until 1-1-2011)
 100 cents = 1 dollar (from 1-1-2011)
Issuing authority is the Netherlands
See also
		Curaçao (Curaçao and Dependencies);
		Netherlands Antilles;
		Netherlands;

Carinthia 

Austrian and Yugoslav overprints used during a plebiscite. Carinthia remained in Austria.

Dates 	1920 only
Currency 	100 heller = 1 krone (Austrian series);
		100 paras = 1 dinar (Yugoslav series)

Refer 	Plebiscite Issues

Carnaro Regency 

Refer 	Arbe;
		Fiume;
		Veglia

Caroline Islands (Karolinen) 

A group of islands in the western South Pacific of which the main ones are Palau, Yap, Truk, Ponape and Kosrae.
They were a Spanish colony from 1885 but there was no postal service as such until 1899 when the islands were purchased by Germany as the protectorate of Karolinen.

Karolinen was administered from Rabaul in German New Guinea. Issues of standard German Colonies types were inscribed KAROLINEN. These were in use 1899–1914. On the outbreak of World War I in 1914, the islands were seized by Japan which retained control until driven out by American forces in WW2. American occupation continued after WW2 and the islands became a UN Trust Territory under USA administration 1947–83. Palau became independent in 1981; the remainder became Federated States of Micronesia in 1983.

Used stamps of Japan 1914–46; used stamps of USA 1946–83.

Dates 	1899–1914
Capital 	Truk
Currency 	100 pfennige = 1 mark

Refer 	German Colonies

See also 	Micronesia;
		Palau

Carpathos 

Refer 	Karpathos

Caso/Casos 

Refer 	Kasos

Castelrosso (Kastellórizo) 

Formerly a Turkish island, Castelrosso (Kastellórizo) was occupied by France 1915–20 and then became one of Italy's Dodecanese colonies. Used own stamps and the general EGEO issues. Part of Greece since 1947 and now called Kastellórizo, which is also the name of the only village.

Dates 	1920–1932
Capital 	Kastellórizo
Currency 	100 centesimi = 1 lira

Refer 	Aegean Islands (Dodecanese)

See also 	French Occupation Issues

Castelrosso (French Occupation) 

Former Turkish island occupied by the French navy in 1915. It was awarded to Italy as part of the Dodecanese in 1921 and, like the rest, was unified with Greece in 1947. It is now called Kastellórizo.

During the French occupation, stamps of France and French Levant were issued with overprints such as
ONF CASTELLORIZO.

Dates 	1920–1921
Currency 	French (100 centimes = 1 franc)
		used concurrently with Turkish (40 paras = 1 piastre)

Refer 	French Occupation Issues

See also 	Aegean Islands (Dodecanese);
		Castelrosso (Kastellórizo)

Castelrosso (Italian Occupation) 

Refer 	Castelrosso (Kastellórizo)

Cauca 

Dates 	1886 only
Currency 	100 centavos = 1 peso

Refer 	Colombian Territories

Cavalla/Cavalle 

Refer 	Kavalla (French Post Office)

Cayes of Belize 

Unofficial issues only.

Refer 	Belize

Cayman Islands 

Dates 	1900 –
Capital 	George Town
Currency 	(1900) 12 pence = 1 shilling; 20 shillings = 1 pound
		(1969) 100 cents = 1 dollar

Main Article
Postage stamps and postal history of the Cayman Islands

CEF 

These initials have been used in two entirely separate spheres. They refer to the international
China Expeditionary Force sent to China in 1900; also to the British forces which occupied German Kamerun
in 1915 (i.e., Cameroons Expeditionary Force).

Refer 	Cameroons (British Occupation);
		China Expeditionary Force

References

Bibliography 
 Stanley Gibbons Ltd, Europe and Colonies 1970, Stanley Gibbons Ltd, 1969
 Stanley Gibbons Ltd, various catalogues
 Stuart Rossiter & John Flower, The Stamp Atlas, W H Smith, 1989
 XLCR Stamp Finder and Collector's Dictionary, Thomas Cliffe Ltd, c.1960

External links
 AskPhil – Glossary of Stamp Collecting Terms
 Encyclopaedia of Postal History

Cabinda